The Croatian pairing of Marin Draganja and Mate Pavić overcame Chinese Taipei's Lee Hsin-han and Peng Hsien-yin 6–4, 4–6, [10–7] in the final.

Seeds

Draw

Draw

References
 Main Draw

Yeongwol Challenger Tennis - Doubles
2013 Doubles